Mick O'Dowd is a former Gaelic footballer and former senior manager for Meath.

O'Dowd previously managed his local club Skryne to success in 2004. He was also a member of the panel in 2001 who were defeated by Galway in the All-Ireland final, Galway became the first team to win an All-Ireland having lost in their province.

In October 2012, he was appointed as Meath manager to replace Séamus McEnaney with his colleague Trevor Giles & Séan Kelly.
In July 2016 O'Dowd stepped down as manager after 4 years in charge.

References

1973 births
Living people
Gaelic football managers
Meath Gaelic footballers
Skryne Gaelic footballers